During the afternoon of May 22, 2004, a long-track F4 tornado formed during a tornado outbreak and tore through multiple counties in southeast Nebraska. The tornado damaged many towns along its path, but its most significant destructive effect occurred at the town of Hallam.

Tornado sequence

The Hallam tornado formed west and northwest of Daykin at 7:30 pm CDT as at F1 intensity on the Fujita Scale. One satellite tornado, rated F1, formed and quickly dissipated northeast of town. During this time, the tornado fluctuated between an F0/1 and intensified. The only damage reported in the area was to farmhouses and silos.

The tornado remained confined within the F0-F1 range until it hit southern Wilber, where it intensified to F2 and blew roofs off of structures.  The tornado continued east-northeast, grazing the east side of Wilber as it moved towards Clatonia. Here it is estimated that the tornado reached F3 strength.

After passing just northwest of Clatonia, the tornado moved through Hallam at 8:35 pm CDT, where damage reached high-end F4 in intensity. Most houses in Hallam were completely demolished, along with farming equipment and structures. A coal train was tossed off its tracks on the west side of town. Hallam escaped the most intense winds of the storm though, which were to the south.

East of Hallam, damage was rated F2-F3 as the tornado turned east and began to cycle. Norris School District 160 suffered severe damage, with the middle school being hit the worst. The auditorium roof and other walls within the school caved in. Buses were tossed and homes northeast of the school were flattened.

At this point, the storm reintensified, reaching F4 status. Damage continued northeast to Holland and to a point north-northwest of Panama. Here, tornado damage was light – F2 at best. The tornado then tracked north-northeast to Bennet, where some houses received F3 damage.  At Bennet, the twister turned east-northeast and began to thin out. Damage east-northeast of Bennet was in the F0-F1 range. The tornado finally dissipated a mile west-southwest of Palmyra at 9:10 pm Central Daylight Time.

Damage
The storm was long-lived, having been on the ground for more than 100 minutes. It was also a long-track tornado, having covered . Even though it damaged towns and demolished many buildings, there were no damage-cost estimates available. However, the Hallam tornado still holds the record for the largest condensation funnel recorded.

See also 
List of F4 and EF4 tornadoes
List of F4 and EF4 tornadoes (2010–2019)
List of F4 and EF4 tornadoes (2020–present)

References

External links

Tornadoes in Nebraska
Tornadoes of 2004
May 2004 events in the United States
2004 in Nebraska